Unc & Phew were an American hip hop superduo composed of Atlanta-based musicians Quavo and Takeoff of Migos. The group released their only studio album Only Built for Infinity Links on October 7, 2022 to generally favorable reviews. On November 1, 2022, less than a month after the release of the duo's first album, Takeoff was shot and killed in Houston, Texas.

Background 
The group's name is derived from the familial relationship between Quavo and Takeoff as uncle and nephew, "Unc" being a shortened form of the word uncle and "Phew" being a shortened form of the word nephew.

History

2022: Formation and debut studio album 

In 2022, rap group Migos, of whom Quavo and Takeoff are a part of, was rumored to have broken up after Quavo's ex-girlfriend Saweetie had reportedly slept with Offset. Quavo alluded to the rift in the duo's song "Messy" and in an interview where he insinuated Offset's lack of loyalty. In May 2022, Quavo and Takeoff released their first track "Hotel Lobby (Unc & Phew)" under the Unc & Phew moniker amid rumors of their rap group Migos' disbandment. In July 2022, they released their single "Us vs. Them" with American rapper Gucci Mane. In August 2022, they released a single with American rapper Birdman titled "Big Stunna". In September 2022, they announced their debut studio album Only Built for Infinity Links  with an October 2022 release date. In an interview with Complex, the duo claimed to have "studied legendary rap duos of old throughout the album’s conception, and paid homage to them in the cover art and title". Also in September 2022, they released what would be the fourth single for their album titled "Nothing Changed". On October 31, 2022, a day prior to Takeoff's death, they released the music video for their song "Messy". On November 1, 2022, Takeoff was shot and killed while with Quavo and others at a Houston bowling alley.

Discography

Studio albums

Singles

Guest appearances
 2022: "PARTY" (DJ Khaled featuring Quavo and Takeoff)

Notes

References 

American hip hop groups
Musical groups established in 2022
Musical groups from Atlanta
African-American musical groups
2022 establishments in the United States